Kuumaa is a Finnish pop band that was founded in 2016 in Helsinki, Finland. They released their first album Kuumaa in April 2019.

Career 
The band signed a record with Universal Music Group based on their first demo in October 2016. Kuumaa were signed to perform at 2017 Provinssirock. At the time of the performance, the band had released their first single "Uppoon suhun", which was released in May 2017. The band released the song "Hulluista runoisa" as their second single, the demo version of which had led to a recording contract. After a total of six single releases, the band's first album Kuumaa was released on April 26, 2019.

Several of Kuumaa's songs received a gold record or a platinum record certificate. The band's most streamed songs are "Oo vielä sekunnin mun" and "Tulipalo". At the end of the 2022, "Tulipalo" became the country's most played song on the radio.

Their entry "" was released on 18 January 2023. Their song for the contest came in first place in The Official Finnish Charts. In the final, they finished in fifth place with a total of 107 points (63 points from the televote and 44 points from the juries).
They won the 2023 Emma Gaala award for "Band of the Year".

Members

Current members 
 Johannes Brotherus – vocals
 Jonttu Luhtavaara – drums
 Aarni Soivio – bass
 Okko Saastamoinen – keyboards (2022–present)

Past members 
 Aapo Närhi – guitar (2016–2021)
 Antti Heiskala – keyboards (2016–2022)

Discography

Studio albums

Singles

References 

2016 establishments in Finland
Finnish musical groups
Finnish pop music groups
Musical groups established in 2016
Musical groups from Helsinki